The ARIA Singles Chart ranks the best-performing singles in Australia. Its data, published by the Australian Recording Industry Association, is based collectively on the weekly physical and digital sales and streams of singles. In 2018, 13 singles have claimed the top spot, including Ed Sheeran's "Perfect", which started its peak position in 2017. Six acts, Ariana Grande, Ty Dolla Sign, Childish Gambino, Dean Lewis, George Ezra and Bradley Cooper, reached the top spot for the first time.

Chart history

Number-one artists

See also
2018 in music
List of number-one albums of 2018 (Australia)
List of top 10 singles in 2018 (Australia)

References

Australia singles
Number-one singles
2018